Reymondia is a genus of freshwater snails, aquatic gastropod mollusks in the family Paludomidae.

Species 
Species in the genus Reymondia include:
 Reymondia horei (Smith, 1880) - type species
 Reymondia minor Smith, 1889
 Reymondia pyramidalis Bourguignat, 1888
 Reymondia tanganyicensis Smith, 1889

References 

Paludomidae
Taxa named by Jules René Bourguignat